Harry's Reasons is the debut studio album by Australian rock band Spy vs. Spy. The album was released in February 1986 on the Powderworks label and was produced by Leszek Karski.

Track listing 
Side A
 "All Over the World" – 4:42
 "Something" – 3:41
 "Learn to Laugh" – 4:17
 "Shirt of a Happy Man" – 4:18
 "Out and Dreaming" – 4:03
 "Dangerman" – 1:28

Side B
 "Harry's Reasons?" – 4:29
 "Way of the World" – 4:06
 "The Wait" – 3:34
 "Iron Curtain" – 3:53
 "Injustice" – 3:10

Charts

Release history

References

1986 debut albums
Spy vs Spy (Australian band) albums